WSTO TV is Stoughton, Wisconsin's community television station.  One of the first Public, educational, and government access (PEG) community channels, started in 1968 by Bob and Janeen Burrel.  WSTO was originally called Viking Media Corp, until becoming WSTO in the early 1970s.  WSTO is currently being broadcast on Charter Communications digital channel 981 and streaming 24/7 with most shows on-demand.  In recent times WSTO was broadcast on Charter Communications Channel 12.  WSTO has 2 full-time staff people, including the Director of IT/Media Services and the Communications Manager and IT Operations Specialist.  WSTO TV is operated by the City of Stoughton Information Technology and Media Services department for Stoughton, Wisconsin and is located on the 2nd floor of the Public Safety Building.  In addition to WSTO TV, The City of Stoughton IT/Media Services Department also operates the Stoughton Sports Network on Spectrum Channel 980.

WSTO Broadcasts 
WSTO broadcasts 24 hours a day 7 day a week in High Definition (online only) or in Standard Definition on Spectrum Channel 981.  WSTO airs Elementary, Middle School and High School Music Performances, Select Stoughton Opera House Events, City Meetings, and various local events.  WSTO has received many awards from Wisconsin Community Media for the coverage of many of these events.  WSTO is one of the few community television channels that have a production truck and will broadcast live from several locations, such as The City Council Chambers, Stoughton High School Gym, Auditorium, Cafetorium, and the Football Field, The Stoughton Opera House, The Stoughton Senior Center and the Mandt Community Center.  Typical live broadcasts on WSTO TV include City Council, Planning Commission, Municipal Court and the Annual Syttende Mai Parades.
In between each show on WSTO there are Public Service Announcements, station IDs, Commercials and the community bulletin board.

Stoughton Sports Network Broadcasts 
The Stoughton Sports Network (SSN) broadcasts 24 hours a day 7 day a week in High Definition (online only) or in Standard Definition on Spectrum Channel 980.  SSN airs current and past sporting events including Stoughton High School Sports, archived High School Sports, and recreation department sports.  All sporting events that are broadcast live are on SSN.

Equipment
WSTO TV broadcast 24 hours a day 7 days a week using an automation system from TelVue.  The automation system consists of a Hypercaster AIO-B2000-12 Video Server, two carousel channels, Teradek Slice Encoders, QAM HD Modulators and receivers for live broadcasts and analog modulators for broadcast on Spectrum Television

WSTO TV operates a complete HD production truck with live-to-air and live-to-file capabilities with live on screen graphics.

In addition to the full production truck, a remote production box, nicknamed "The Roadbox", has similar capabilities to the production truck without being inside a vehicle.

Additionally WSTO has a permanent control room inside the WSTO Station, used for in studio shows and events in the council chambers/court room.  Additionally there is a complete control booth at the Stoughton EMS Building which is used for council meeting or special recordings in the Hanson Room.

WSTO uses state of the art professional video cameras for remote shoots.  Our fleet of cameras consists of three Canon XF300 cameras and two Canon XF405 Cameras.

WSTO has non-linear edit suites with the Vegas Pro Video (Vegas Pro Video 10.0e) and the accompanying version of DVD Architect as well as the full Adobe Creative Suite

Those looking to visit the WSTO Station can contact them at 608-873-7523.

WSTO Sports Sponsors
WSTO relies on sponsors to help with the massive costs of covering Stoughton High School Sports.  These sponsors include Stoughton Hospital, Stoughton Trailers, The UPS Store Stoughton, McGlynn Pharmacy, Inkworks of Stoughton, Radio Shack/Hanson Electronics of Stoughton and Stoughton Pizza Pit

References

External links
WSTO Online

Television stations in Wisconsin
American public access television
Television channels and stations established in 1968